John Mdluli (born 14 July 1972) is an Eswatini former professional footballer who played as a forward for clubs in South Africa and Israel.

Club career
Mdluli was one of the top scorers in 2006 in Eswatini (then Swaziland).

A goal he scored while playing for Hapoel Jerusalem against Maccabi Ironi Kiryat Ata in 2001 was voted for the goal of the decade by Hapoel Jerusalem Supporters.

International career
With the Eswatini national team, Mdluli participated at the 2001 COSAFA Cup.

References

External links
 
 

1972 births
Living people
Swazi footballers
Association football forwards
Eswatini international footballers
Liga Leumit players
Hapoel Jerusalem F.C. players
Swazi expatriate footballers
Expatriate footballers in Israel
Swazi expatriate sportspeople in South Africa
Expatriate soccer players in South Africa